"Perfidia" is a popular Mexican song. 

It may also refer to:

Perfidia (Rossner novel), by Judith Rossner
Perfidia (Ellroy novel), by James Ellroy, published in 2014
"Perfidia" (Journeyman), an episode of the TV show Journeyman
The Man in Grey, a 1943 British drama film released in Spain and Portugal as Perfidia
Les Dames du Bois de Boulogne, a 1945 French film released in Italy as Perfidia
Perfidia (film), a 2009 Bolivian film directed by Rodrigo Bellott, starring Gonzalo Valenzuela